Speranza argillacearia, the mousy angle moth, is a species of geometrid moth in the family Geometridae. It is found in North America. Its larval host is blueberry (Vaccinium) and another common name for it is the blueberry spanworm.

The MONA or Hodges number for Speranza argillacearia is 6282.

References

Further reading

 

Macariini
Articles created by Qbugbot
Moths described in 1874